Ma Ning (born 14 June 1979) is a Chinese football referee. He has been a full international referee for FIFA since 2011.

He is a teacher of Wuxi Vocational and Technical College.

On 9 May 2015, Ma drew widespread controversy as he sent off 3 Shenhua players in a Shanghai derby between Shanghai SIPG and Shanghai Shenhua in the Chinese Super League, the game finished 5-0 to SIPG.

On 23 February 2019, it was announced that Ma Ning had been hired by CFA to become one 
of the professional referees in China.

On 19 May 2022, Ma was selected as one of the 36 referees for the 2022 FIFA World Cup, becoming the second Chinese referee to achieve this since Lu Jun in 2002.

On 21 August 2022, during a Chinese Super League game between Wuhan Yangtze River and Henan Songshan Longmen, Ma was deliberately knocked over by Songshan Longmen striker Henrique Dourado, who was subsequently sent off for violent conduct. The game finished 2-2. Five days later, the Chinese FA announced a 12-month suspension to Dourado, which was the severest penalty in the history of Chinese Super League.

AFC Asian Cup

References 

Chinese football referees
Living people
1979 births
People from Fuxin
2022 FIFA World Cup referees
FIFA World Cup referees
AFC Asian Cup referees